Quri Waraqa (Quechua quri gold, waraqa sack, "gold sack", Hispanicized spelling Corihuaraca)  or Quri Warak'a (warak'a sling or slingshot, "gold sling" or "gold slingshot") is a mountain in the Wansu mountain range in the Andes of Peru, about  high. It is situated in the Apurímac Region, Antabamba Province, in the districts of Antabamba and Juan Espinoza Medrano. Quri Waraqa lies north of Sara Sara, Panti Pata and Huch'uy Sara Sara.

References 

Mountains of Peru
Mountains of Apurímac Region